The Dongpingshuidao Bridge is an arch bridge located in Foshan, Guangdong, China. Opened in 2009, it spans  over the Dongping waterway, an arm of the Pearl River. The bridge carries the Wuhan–Guangzhou High-Speed Railway.

See also
List of longest arch bridge spans

Arch bridges in China
Buildings and structures in Foshan
Bridges over the Pearl River (China)
Bridges completed in 2009
Bridges in Guangdong